This is a list of painters from Romania.

A 
Béla Nagy Abodi
Călin Alupi
Theodor Aman
Ion Andreescu
Ion Valentin Anestin
Nina Arbore
Gheorghe Asachi

B 
Corneliu Baba
Liviu Cornel Babeș
Aurel Băeșu
Auguste Baillayre
Tatiana Baillayre
Sabin Bălaşa
Octav Băncilă
Ignat Bednarik
Horia Bernea
Zsolt Bodoni
Alexandru Bogdan-Pitești
Friedrich von Bömches
Victor Brauner
Marius Bunescu
Marcel Bejgu
Constantin Baciu

C 
Ștefan Câlția
Silvia Cambir
Mateiu Caragiale
Henri Catargi
Alexandru Ciucurencu
Aurel Ciupe
Nicolae Comănescu
Lena Constante
Arthur Coulin
Noche Crist

D 
Horia Damian
Nicolae Dărăscu
Alexandru Darida
Margarete Depner
Ștefan Dimitrescu
Felicia Donceanu
Alexandru Donici
Eugen Drăguţescu
Natalia Dumitresco
Zamfir Dumitrescu

G 
Gunther Forst Gasser
Marin Georgescu
Adrian Ghenie
Dumitru Ghiaţă
Ion Grigorescu
Lucian Grigorescu
Nicolae Grigorescu
Nicolae Gropeanu

H 
Petre Hârtopeanu
Vasile Hutopilă

I 
Semproniu Iclozan
Sorin Ilfoveanu
Iosif Iser
Alexandre Istrati

J 
Stefan Jäger
Marcel Janco

L 
Myra Landau
Constantin Lecca
Ștefan Luchian

M 
Victor Man
Tasso Marchini
János Mattis-Teutsch
Henry Mavrodin
M. H. Maxy
Friedrich Miess
George Demetrescu Mirea
Ioan Mirea
Teodor Moraru
Pârvu Mutul
Sultana Maitec

N 
Alexandra Nechita
Mihai Nechita
Jean Negulesco
Ion Negulici
Romul Nuțiu

P 
Neculai Păduraru
Theodor Pallady
Gheorghe Panaiteanu Bardasare
Lili Pancu
Paul Păun
Jean de Paleologu
Ștefan Pelmuș
Gheorghe Petrașcu
Costin Petrescu
Laura Poantă
Julius Podlipny
Gabriel Popa
Elena Popea
Gheorghe Popovici
Mișu Popp
Virgil Preda
Florica Prevenda

R 
Silvia Radu
Stefan Ramniceanu
Alma Redlinger
Camil Ressu
Constantin Daniel Rosenthal
Reuven Rubin
Maria Rusescu

S 
Edmond van Saanen Algi
Dimitrie Serafim
Victor Schivert
Rudolf Schweitzer-Cumpăna
Mihail Simonidi
Constantin Daniel Stahi
Jean Alexandru Steriadi
Hedda Sterne
Eustațiu Stoenescu
Ipolit Strǎmbu

Ș 
Gheorghe Șaru
Francisc Șirato 
Raoul Șorban
George Ștefănescu
Ion Șinca

T 
Eugen Taru
Gheorghe Tattarescu
Nicolae Teodorescu
Ion Theodorescu-Sion
János Thorma
Nicolae Tonitza
Henric Trenk
Traian Trestioreanu

Ț 
Ion Țuculescu

V 
Nicolae Vermont
Leon Viorescu
Eugeniu Voinescu
Lascăr Vorel

Z 
Victor Zâmbrea

See also
Culture of Romania

External links

Romanian
 
Painters